A culture war is a cultural conflict between social groups and the struggle for dominance of their values, beliefs, and practices. It commonly refers to topics on which there is general societal disagreement and polarization in societal values. 

Its contemporary use refers to a social phenomenon in which multiple social groups, holding distinct values and ideologies, attempt to steer public policy in opposition to each other, thus a culture war now describes "hot button" or "polarizing" social issues in politics and public policy. 

Contemporary wedge issues in the United States include abortion, homosexuality, transgender rights, pornography, multiculturalism, racism and other cultural conflicts based on values, morality, and lifestyle which are described as the major political cleavage.

Etymology
The term culture war is a loan translation (calque) of the German Kulturkampf ('culture struggle'). In German, Kulturkampf, a term coined by Rudolf Virchow, refers to the clash between cultural and religious groups in the campaign from 1871 to 1878 under Chancellor Otto von Bismarck of the German Empire against the influence of the Catholic Church. The translation was printed in some American newspapers at the time.

United States

1920s–1980s: Origins

In American usage, "culture war" may imply a conflict between those values considered traditionalist or conservative and those considered progressive or liberal. This usage originated in the 1920s when urban and rural American values came into closer conflict. This followed several decades of immigration to the States by people who earlier European immigrants considered 'alien'. It was also a result of the cultural shifts and modernizing trends of the Roaring '20s, culminating in the presidential campaign of Al Smith in 1928. In subsequent decades during the 20th century, the term was published occasionally in American newspapers.

1991–2001: Rise in prominence
James Davison Hunter, a sociologist at the University of Virginia, introduced the expression again in his 1991 publication, Culture Wars: The Struggle to Define America. Hunter described what he saw as a dramatic realignment and polarization that had transformed American politics and culture.

He argued that on an increasing number of "hot-button" defining issues—abortion, gun politics, separation of church and state, privacy, recreational drug use, homosexuality, censorship—there existed two definable polarities. Furthermore, not only were there a number of divisive issues, but society had divided along essentially the same lines on these issues, so as to constitute two warring groups, defined primarily not by nominal religion, ethnicity, social class, or even political affiliation, but rather by ideological world-views.

Hunter characterized this polarity as stemming from opposite impulses, toward what he referred to as Progressivism and as Orthodoxy. Others have adopted the dichotomy with varying labels. For example, Bill O'Reilly, a conservative political commentator and former host of the Fox News Channel talk show The O'Reilly Factor, emphasizes differences between "Secular-Progressives" and "Traditionalists" in his 2006 book Culture Warrior.

Historian Kristin Kobes Du Mez attributes the 1990s emergence of culture wars to the end of the Cold War in 1991. She writes that Evangelical Christians viewed a particular Christian masculine gender role as the only defense of America against the threat of communism. When this threat ended upon the close of the Cold War, Evangelical leaders transferred the perceived source of threat from foreign communism to domestic changes in gender roles and sexuality.

During the 1992 presidential election, commentator Pat Buchanan mounted a campaign for the Republican nomination for president against incumbent George H. W. Bush. In a prime-time slot at the 1992 Republican National Convention, Buchanan gave his speech on the culture war. He argued: "There is a religious war going on in our country for the soul of America. It is a cultural war, as critical to the kind of nation we will one day be as was the Cold War itself." In addition to criticizing environmentalists and feminism, he portrayed public morality as a defining issue:

The agenda [Bill] Clinton and [Hillary] Clinton would impose on America—abortion on demand, a litmus test for the Supreme Court, homosexual rights, discrimination against religious schools, women in combat units—that's change, all right. But it is not the kind of change America wants. It is not the kind of change America needs. And it is not the kind of change we can tolerate in a nation that we still call God's country.

A month later, Buchanan characterized the conflict as about power over society's definition of right and wrong. He named abortion, sexual orientation and popular culture as major fronts—and mentioned other controversies, including clashes over the Confederate flag, Christmas, and taxpayer-funded art. He also said that the negative attention his "culture war" speech received was itself evidence of America's polarization.

The culture war had significant impact on national politics in the 1990s. The rhetoric of the Christian Coalition of America may have weakened president George H. W. Bush's chances for re-election in 1992 and helped his successor, Bill Clinton, win reelection in 1996. On the other hand, the rhetoric of conservative cultural warriors helped Republicans gain control of Congress in 1994.

The culture wars influenced the debate over state-school history curricula in the United States in the 1990s. In particular, debates over the development of national educational standards in 1994 revolved around whether the study of American history should be a "celebratory" or "critical" undertaking and involved such prominent public figures as Lynne Cheney, the late Rush Limbaugh, and historian Gary Nash.

2001–2014: Post-9/11 era

A political view called neoconservatism shifted the terms of the debate in the early 2000s. Neoconservatives differed from their opponents in that they interpreted problems facing the nation as moral issues rather than economic or political issues. For example, neoconservatives saw the decline of the traditional family structure as a spiritual crisis that required a spiritual response. Critics accused neoconservatives of confusing cause and effect.

During the 2000s, voting for Republicans began to correlate heavily with traditionalist or orthodox religious belief across diverse religious sects. Voting for Democrats became more correlated to liberal or modernist religious belief, and to being nonreligious. Belief in scientific conclusions, such as climate change, also became tightly coupled to political party affiliation in this era, causing climate scholar Andrew Hoffman to observe that climate change had "become enmeshed in the so-called culture wars."

Topics traditionally associated with culture war were not prominent in media coverage of the 2008 election season, with the exception of coverage of vice-presidential candidate Sarah Palin, who drew attention to her conservative religion and created a performative climate change denialism brand for herself. Palin's defeat in the election and subsequent resignation as governor of Alaska caused the Center for American Progress to predict "the coming end of the culture wars," which they attributed to demographic change, particularly high rates of acceptance of same-sex marriage among millennials.

2014–present: Broadening of the culture war

While traditional culture war issues, notably abortion, continue to be a focal point, the issues identified with culture war broadened and intensified in the mid-late 2010s. Journalist Michael Grunwald says that "President Donald Trump has pioneered a new politics of perpetual culture war" and lists the Black Lives Matter movement, U.S. national anthem protests, climate change, education policy, healthcare policy including Obamacare, and infrastructure policy as culture war issues in 2018. The rights of transgender people and the role of religion in lawmaking were identified as "new fronts in the culture war" by political scientist Jeremiah Castle, as the polarization of public opinion on these two topics resemble that of previous culture war issues. In 2020, during the COVID-19 pandemic, North Dakota governor Doug Burgum described opposition to wearing face masks as a "senseless" culture war issue that jeopardizes human safety.

This broader understanding of culture war issues in the mid-late 2010s and 2020s is associated with a political strategy called "owning the libs." Conservative media figures employing this strategy, emphasize and expand upon culture war issues with the goal of upsetting liberal people. According to Nicole Hemmer of Columbia University, this strategy is a substitute for the cohesive conservative ideology that existed during the Cold War. It holds a conservative voting bloc together in the absence of shared policy preferences among the bloc's members.

A number of conflicts about diversity in popular culture occurring in the 2010s, such as the Gamergate harassment campaign, Comicsgate and the Sad Puppies science fiction voting campaign, were identified in the media as being examples of the culture war. Journalist Caitlin Dewey described Gamergate as a "proxy war" for a larger culture war between those who want greater inclusion of women and minorities in cultural institutions versus anti-feminists and traditionalists who do not. The perception that culture war conflict had been demoted from electoral politics to popular culture led writer Jack Meserve to call popular movies, games, and writing the "last front in the culture war" in 2015.

These conflicts about representation in popular culture re-emerged into electoral politics via the alt-right and alt-lite movements. According to media scholar Whitney Phillips, Gamergate "prototyped" strategies of harassment and controversy-stoking that proved useful in political strategy. For example, Republican political strategist Steve Bannon publicized pop-culture conflicts during the 2016 presidential campaign of Donald Trump, encouraging a young audience to "come in through Gamergate or whatever and then get turned onto politics and Trump."

Criticism and evaluation

Since the time that James Davison Hunter first applied the concept of culture wars to American life, the idea has been subject to questions about whether "culture wars" names a real phenomenon, and if so, whether the phenomenon it describes is a cause of, or merely a result of, membership in groups like political parties and religions. Culture wars have also been subject to the criticism of being artificial, imposed, or asymmetric conflicts, rather than a result of authentic differences between cultures.

Validity

Researchers have differed about the scientific validity of the notion of culture war. Some claim it does not describe real behavior, or that it describes only the behavior of a small political elite. Others claim culture war is real and widespread, and even that it is fundamental to explaining Americans' political behavior and beliefs.

Political scientist Alan Wolfe participated in a series of scholarly debates in the 1990s and 2000s against Hunter, claiming that Hunter's concept of culture wars did not accurately describe the opinions or behavior of Americans, which Wolfe claimed were more united than polarized.

A meta-analysis of opinion data from 1992 to 2012 published in the American Political Science Review concluded that, in contrast to a common belief that political party and religious membership shape opinion on culture war topics, instead opinions on culture war topics lead people to revise their political party and religious orientations. The researchers view culture war attitudes as "foundational elements in the political and religious belief systems of ordinary citizens."

Artificiality or asymmetry

Some writers and scholars have said that culture wars are created or perpetuated by political special interest groups, by reactionary social movements, by dynamics within the Republican party, or by electoral politics as a whole. These authors view culture war not as an unavoidable result of widespread cultural differences, but as a technique used to create in-groups and out-groups for a political purpose.

Political commentator E. J. Dionne has written that culture war is an electoral technique to exploit differences and grievances, remarking that the real cultural division is "between those who want to have a culture war and those who don't."

Sociologist Scott Melzer says that culture wars are created by conservative, reactive organizations and movements. Members of these movements possess a "sense of victimization at the hands of a liberal culture run amok. In their eyes, immigrants, gays, women, the poor, and other groups are (undeservedly) granted special rights and privileges." Melzer writes about the example of the National Rifle Association of America, which he says intentionally created a culture war in order to unite conservative groups, particularly groups of white men, against a common perceived threat.

Similarly, religion scholar Susan B. Ridgely has written that culture wars were made possible by Focus on the Family. This organization produced conservative Christian "alternative news" that began to bifurcate American media consumption, promoting a particular "traditional family" archetype to one part of the population, particularly conservative religious women. Ridgely says that this tradition was depicted as under liberal attack, seeming to necessitate a culture war to defend the tradition.

Political scientists Matt Grossmann and David A. Hopkins have written about an asymmetry between the US's two major political parties, saying the Republican party should be understood as an ideological movement built to wage political conflict, and the Democratic party as a coalition of social groups with less ability to impose ideological discipline on members. This encourages Republicans to perpetuate and to draw new issues into culture wars, because Republicans are well equipped to fight such wars.

According to The Guardian, "many on the left have argued that such [culture war] battles [a]re 'distractions' from the real fight over class and economic issues."

Canada

Some observers in Canada have used the term "culture war" to refer to differing values between Western versus Eastern Canada, urban versus rural Canada, as well as conservatism versus liberalism and progressivism.

Nevertheless, Canadian society is generally not dramatically polarized over immigration, gun control, drug legality, sexual morality, or government involvement in healthcare: the main issues at play in the United States.  In all of those cases, the majority of Canadians, including Conservatives would support the "progressive" position in the United States.  In Canada a different set of issues create a clash of values.  Chief among these are language policy in Canada, minority religious rights, pipeline politics, indigenous land rights, climate policy, and federal-provincial disputes.

It is a relatively new phrase in Canadian political commentary. It can still be used to describe historical events in Canada, such as the Rebellions of 1837, Western Alienation, the Quebec sovereignty movement, and any Aboriginal conflicts in Canada; but is more relevant to current events such as the Grand River land dispute and the increasing hostility between conservative and liberal Canadians. The phrase has also been used to describe the Harper government's attitude towards the arts community. Andrew Coyne termed this negative policy towards the arts community as "class warfare."

Australia

During the tenure of the Liberal–National Coalition government of 1996 to 2007, interpretations of Aboriginal history became a part of a wider political debate regarding Australian national pride and symbolism occasionally called the "culture wars", more often the "history wars". This debate extended into a controversy over the presentation of history in the National Museum of Australia and in high-school history curricula. It also migrated into the general Australian media, with major broadsheets such as The Australian, The Sydney Morning Herald and The Age regularly publishing opinion pieces on the topic. Marcia Langton has referred to much of this wider debate as "war porn" and as an "intellectual dead end".

Two Australian Prime Ministers, Paul Keating (in office 1991–1996) and John Howard (in office 1996–2007), became major participants in the "wars". According to Mark McKenna's analysis for the Australian Parliamentary Library, John Howard believed that Paul Keating portrayed Australia pre-Whitlam (Prime Minister from 1972 to 1975) in an unduly negative light; while Keating sought to distance the modern Labor movement from its historical support for the monarchy and for the White Australia policy by arguing that it was the conservative Australian parties which had been barriers to national progress. He accused Britain of having abandoned Australia during the Second World War. Keating staunchly supported a symbolic apology to Australian Aboriginals for their mistreatment at the hands of previous administrations, and outlined his view of the origins and potential solutions to contemporary Aboriginal disadvantage in his Redfern Park Speech of 10 December 1992 (drafted with the assistance of historian Don Watson). In 1999, following the release of the 1998 Bringing Them Home Report, Howard passed a Parliamentary Motion of Reconciliation describing treatment of Aborigines as the "most blemished chapter" in Australian history, but he refused to issue an official apology. Howard saw an apology as inappropriate as it would imply "intergeneration guilt"; he said that "practical" measures were a better response to contemporary Aboriginal disadvantage. Keating has argued for the eradication of remaining symbols linked to colonial origins: including deference for ANZAC Day, for the Australian flag and for the monarchy in Australia, while Howard supported these institutions. Unlike fellow Labor leaders and contemporaries, Bob Hawke (Prime Minister 1983–1991) and Kim Beazley (Labor Party leader 2005–2006), Keating never traveled to Gallipoli for ANZAC Day ceremonies. In 2008 he described those who gathered there as "misguided".

In 2006 John Howard said in a speech to mark the 50th anniversary of Quadrant that "Political Correctness" was dead in Australia but: "we should not underestimate the degree to which the soft-left still holds sway, even dominance, especially in Australia's universities". Also in 2006, Sydney Morning Herald political editor Peter Hartcher reported that Opposition foreign-affairs spokesman Kevin Rudd was entering the philosophical debate by arguing in response that "John Howard, is guilty of perpetrating 'a fraud' in his so-called culture wars ... designed not to make real change but to mask the damage inflicted by the Government's economic policies".

The defeat of the Howard government in the Australian Federal election of 2007 and its replacement by the Rudd Labor government altered the dynamic of the debate. Rudd made an official apology to the Aboriginal Stolen Generation with bi-partisan support. Like Keating, Rudd supported an Australian republic, but in contrast to Keating, Rudd declared support for the Australian flag and supported the commemoration of ANZAC Day; he also expressed admiration for Liberal Party founder Robert Menzies.

Subsequent to the 2007 change of government, and prior to the passage, with support from all parties, of the Parliamentary apology to indigenous Australians, Professor of Australian Studies Richard Nile argued: "the culture and history wars are over and with them should also go the adversarial nature of intellectual debate", a view contested by others, including conservative commentator Janet Albrechtsen.

Climate change in Australia is also considered a highly divisive or politically controversial topic, to the point it is sometimes called a "culture war".

Africa

According to political scientist Constance G. Anthony, American culture war perspectives on human sexuality were exported to Africa as a form of neocolonialism. In his view, this began during the AIDS epidemic in Africa, with the United States government first tying HIV/AIDS assistance money to evangelical leadership and the Christian right during the Bush administration, then to LGBTQ tolerance during the administration of Barack Obama. This stoked a culture war that resulted in (among others) the Uganda Anti-Homosexuality Act of 2014.

Zambian scholar Kapya Kaoma notes that because "the demographic center of Christianity is shifting from the global North to the global South" Africa's influence on Christianity worldwide is increasing. American conservatives export their culture wars to Africa, Kaoma says, particularly when they realize they may be losing the battle back home. US Christians have framed their anti-LGBT initiatives in Africa as standing in opposition to a "Western gay agenda", a framing which Kaoma finds ironic.

North American and European conspiracy theories have become widespread in West Africa via social media, according to 2021 survey by First Draft News. COVID-19 misinformation, New World Order conspiracy thinking, QAnon and other conspiracy theories associated with culture war topics are spread by American, Pro-Russian, French-language, and local disinformation websites and social media accounts, including prominent politicians in Nigeria. This has contributed to vaccine hesitancy in West Africa, with 60 percent of survey respondents saying they were unlikely to try to get vaccinated, and an erosion of trust in institutions in the region.

China

The Chinese Civil War and Chinese Communist Revolution resulted in the Chinese Communist Party (CCP) establishing the People's Republic of China in 1949. Mao Zedong launched the Cultural Revolution in 1966 with the aim to attack the Four Olds - Old Ideas, Old Culture, Old Habits, and Old Customs. Between 1966 and 1976, the Red Guards destroyed the old society and killed the enemies of communism.

United Kingdom
A 2021 report from King's College London argued that many people's views on cultural issues in Britain have become tied up with the side of the Brexit debate with which they identify, while the public party-political identities, although not as strong, show similar alignments and that around half the country held relatively strong views on "culture war" issues such as debates on Britain's colonial history or Black Lives Matter. However, the report concluded Britain's cultural and political divide was not as stark as the Republican-Democratic divide in the US and that a sizeable section of the public can be categorised as having either moderate views or as being disengaged from social debates. It also found that The Guardian as opposed to the centre-right newspapers were more likely to talk about the culture wars. The Conservative Party have been described as attempting to ignite culture wars in regard to "conservative values" under the tenure of Prime Minister Boris Johnson.

However, others argue that it is the left who are engaging in "culture wars" particularly against liberal values, accepted words and British institutions. Observers such as Johns Hopkins University professor Yascha Mounk and journalist Louise Perry have argued that a collapse in support for the Labour Party during the 2019 United Kingdom general election came as a result of both a public perception and a deliberate strategy of Labour of pursuing messages and policy ideas based on cultural issues that resonated with grassroots activists on the left of the party but alienated Labour's traditional working class voters.

An April 2022 survey found evidence that Britons are less divided on "culture war" issues than has often been portrayed in the media. The greatest predictor of opinion was how people voted in the UK's referendum on membership of the European Union, Brexit, yet even among those who voted 'Leave', 75% agreed "it is important to be attentive to issues of race and social justice". Similarly, even among Remainers and those who last voted for the Labour Party, there was moderately strong support for several socially conservative positions.

Europe

Several media outlets have accused the Law and Justice party in Poland, Viktor Orbán in Hungary, Aleksandar Vučić in Serbia, and Janez Janša in Slovenia of igniting culture wars in their respective countries by encouraging dissent and resistance to LGBT rights, legal abortion, and other topics.  According to The National Interest, there is a cultural war in Ukraine.

After 2017, Poland's Law and Justice (PiS) government demolished most Soviet War Memorials in Poland.

In early 2018, both chambers of the parliament (the Sejm and Senate) of the Third Polish Republic passed an Amendment to the Act on the Institute of National Remembrance, criminalizing the ascription to Polish people of collective responsibility for the World War II-era Holocaust in Poland and other Nazi war crimes, while also formally condemning the expression, "Polish death camp". The law sparked a crisis in Israel–Poland relations. The Amendment's passage further worsened Poland–Ukraine relations, which were already contentious over the paramilitary Organization of Ukrainian Nationalists and the wartime and postwar Ukrainian Insurgent Army, whose leaders were Stepan Bandera and Roman Shukhevych. Both organizations and their leaders are seen in Ukraine as icons and martyrs of the anti-Soviet Ukrainian nationalist resistance and in Poland as terrorists and genocidal war criminals. Meanwhile, the often acrimonious debate regarding the Ukrainian Insurgent Army and their massacres of Poles in Volhynia and Eastern Galicia continues. Ukrainian memory laws (the Ukrainian decommunization laws) passed in 2015, honoring UPA, related organizations and their members, have accordingly been widely criticized in the Second Polish Republic.

In June 2020, Polish President Andrzej Duda vowed to oppose both same-sex marriage and LGBT adoption. Duda further described the Pro-LGBT movement as "a foreign ideology" and compared it to forced communist indoctrination in the Polish educational system during the Soviet Bloc period.

In 2022 Princeton University sociologist Kim Scheppele alleged during an interview NPR that the culture wars have been used as a disguise for democratic backsliding in Viktor Orbán led Hungary.

See also

Drugs
Drug decriminalization
Harm reduction
Legal drinking age
War on Drugs

Education and parenting
Corporal punishment and child discipline, most notably spanking
Creation–evolution controversy
Family values
Homeschooling and educational choice
Sexual education and abstinence only education

Environment and energy
Global warming controversy

Gender and sexuality
Anti-gender movement
Age of consent
Circumcision controversies
Feminism
LGBT rights and same-sex marriage
Polyamory
Sex work
Sexual revolution

Law and government
Crypto wars
Gun rights
Immigration reform
Law and order
Red state vs. blue state divide

Life issues
Anti-war movement
Capital punishment
Reproductive rights including birth control (and its coverage by insurance)
Right to die movement and euthanasia
Stem-cell research
Universal healthcare

Society and culture
Animal rights
Call-out culture
Christmas controversy
Counterculture
Cultural conflict

Geographical renaming
History wars
Media bias in the U.S.
Moral absolutism vs. moral relativism
Multiculturalism
Negationism
Permissive society
Race, affirmative action
Secularism and secularization
Theory wars

References

Further reading
 Chapman, Roger, and James Ciment. Culture Wars: An Encyclopedia of Issues, Viewpoints and Voices (2nd ed. Routledge, 2015)
 D'Antonio, William V., Steven A. Tuch and Josiah R. Baker, Religion, Politics, and Polarization: How Religiopolitical Conflict Is Changing Congress and American Democracy (Rowman & Littlefield, 2013)  
 Fiorina, Morris P., with Samuel J. Abrams and Jeremy C. Pope, Culture War?: The Myth of a Polarized America (Longman, 2004) 
 Graff, Gerald. Beyond the Culture Wars: How Teaching the Conflicts Can Revitalize American Education (1992)
 Hartman, Andrew. A war for the soul of America: a history of the culture wars (University of Chicago Press, 2015)
 Hunter, James Davison, Culture Wars: The Struggle to Define America (New York: Basic Books, 1992) 
 Jay, Gregory S., American Literature and the Culture Wars, (Cornell University Press, 1997)  
 Jensen, Richard. "The Culture Wars, 1965-1995: A Historian's Map" Journal of Social History 29 (Oct 1995) 17–37. in JSTOR
 Jones, E. Michael, Degenerate Moderns: Modernity As Rationalized Sexual Misbehavior, Ft. Collins, CO: Ignatius Press, 1993 
 
 Strauss, William & Howe, Neil, The Fourth Turning, An American Prophecy: What the Cycles of History Tell Us About America's Next Rendezvous With Destiny, 1998, Broadway Books, New York
 Thomson, Irene Tavis., Culture Wars and Enduring American Dilemmas, (University of Michigan Press, 2010) 
 Walsh, Andrew D., Religion, Economics, and Public Policy: Ironies, Tragedies, and Absurdities of the Contemporary Culture Wars, (Praeger, 2000) 
 Webb, Adam K., Beyond the Global Culture War, (Routledge, 2006) 
 Zimmerman, Jonathan, Whose America? Culture Wars in the Public Schools (Harvard University Press, 2002)

External links
 

Political terminology of the United States
War
Christian fundamentalism
War